Watkins Glen can refer to:

 Watkins Glen, New York, a village in New York state
 Watkins Glen International, an automobile race course near the village
 Watkins Glen State Park, a state park in Watkins Glen, New York
 Summer Jam at Watkins Glen, an outdoor rock festival held "Woodstock-style" outside Watkins Glen, New York in 1973